Ora Carew (born Ora Whytock; April 19, 1891 – October 26, 1955), was an American silent film actress. She starred in several films between 1915 and 1925. She was known as one of the Sennett Bathing Beauties.

Early life 
Ora Whytock was born in Salt Lake City, Utah, to James Whytock and Evelyn Carn Whytock (1865–1942). She had an older sister, Evelyn Whytock Lehners (1887–1961), who became a music composer, and a younger brother, Grant Whytock (1894–1981), who became a film editor. Ora's birth year has been listed as 1893, on her death certificate and is also what her grave says, but Utah birth index and the 1900 census indicate 1891.

She was educated by private tutors and at Roland Hall Seminary. After her father died on June 19, 1896, her mother moved with her three children to California.

Career 
Carew acted on stage, including work in stock companies and in musical comedies, and she was a vaudeville performer. She acted on film with MGM and Universal.

Later years and death 
After a failed comeback in 1926, she starred in Los Angeles stage plays and toured vaudeville. From 1940 until her death, she operated a cosmetics shop in Hollywood. Carew died of a stroke at a Los Angeles sanitarium on October 26, 1955, and was interred at Forest Lawn Memorial Park in Glendale, California.

Personal life 
Carew married Harry E. Grant on June 15, 1908, in El Paso, Texas. The couple had one daughter, Lotus Grant (October 20, 1909 – June 25, 2007), who married Fred R. Feitshans Jr., making film producer Buzz Feitshans Carew's grandson.

Ora and Harry divorced before 1920. She remarried to John C. Howard in December 1922 in Hollywood, California, and they divorced in 1924.

She was exceptionally fond of outdoor sports and found her greatest pleasure in motoring around Hollywood and Los Angeles in her raceabout.

Selected filmography 
 Martyrs of the Alamo (1915)
 A La Cabaret (1916)
 Too Many Millions (1918)
 Go West, Young Man (1918)
 Terror of the Range (1919)
 Loot (1919)
 Peddler of Lies (1920)
 The Figurehead (1920)
 Blind Youth (1920)
 Her Bridal Nightmare (1920) (writer)
 Alias Ladyfingers (1921)
 After Your Own Heart (1921)
 The Little Fool (1921)
 A Voice in the Dark (1921)
 Beyond the Crossroads (1922)
 The Girl from Rocky Point (1922)
 Smiles Are Trumps (1922)
 Smudge (1922)
 Sherlock Brown (1922)
 Paying the Limit (1924)
 Getting Her Man (1924)
 The Torrent (1924)

References

External links 

Actresses from Salt Lake City
American film actresses
American silent film actresses
1890s births
1955 deaths
20th-century American actresses